The Paris Agreement is an agreement within the United Nations Framework Convention on Climate Change (UNFCCC) dealing with greenhouse gas emissions mitigation, adaptation and finance starting in the year 2020. The Agreement aims to respond to the global climate change threat by keeping a global temperature rise this century well below 2 degrees Celsius above pre-industrial levels and to pursue efforts to limit the temperature increase even further to 1.5 degrees Celsius.

History
The language of the agreement was negotiated by representatives of 197 parties at the 21st Conference of the Parties of the UNFCCC in Paris and adopted by consensus on 12 December 2015.  The Agreement was open for signature by States and regional economic integration organizations that are Parties to the UNFCCC (the Convention) from 22 April 2016 to 21 April 2017 at the UN Headquarters in New York. The agreement stated that it would enter into force (and thus become fully effective) only if 55 countries that produce at least 55% of the world's greenhouse gas emissions (according to a list produced in 2015) ratify, accept, approve or accede to the agreement. On 1 April 2016, the United States and China, which together represent almost 40% of global emissions, issued a joint statement confirming that both countries would sign the Paris Climate Agreement. 175 Parties (174 states and the European Union) signed the agreement on the first date it was open for signature. On the same day, more than 20 countries issued a statement of their intent to join as soon as possible with a view to joining in 2016. With ratification by the European Union, the Agreement obtained enough parties to enter into effect as of 4 November 2016.

Parties
As of February 2023, 194 states and the EU, representing over 98% of global greenhouse gas emissions, have ratified or acceded to the Agreement, including China and the United States, the countries with the 1st and 2nd largest CO2 emissions among UNFCCC members.  A further 3 states have signed the Agreement but not ratified it.  All 198 UNFCCC members have either signed or acceded to the Paris Agreement.

European Union and its member states
Both the EU and its member states are individually responsible for ratifying the Paris Agreement. A strong preference was reported that the EU and its 28 member states deposit their instruments of ratification at the same time to ensure that neither the EU nor its member states engage themselves to fulfilling obligations that strictly belong to the other, and there were fears that disagreement over each individual member state's share of the EU-wide reduction target, as well as Britain's vote to leave the EU might delay the Paris pact. However, the European Parliament approved ratification of the Paris Agreement on 4 October 2016, and the EU deposited its instruments of ratification on 5 October 2016, along with several individual EU member states.

Withdrawal from Agreement 

Article 28 of the agreement enables parties to withdraw from the agreement after sending a withdrawal notification to the depositary, but notice can be given no earlier than three years after the agreement goes into force for the country. Withdrawal is effective one year after the depositary is notified. Alternatively, the Agreement stipulates that withdrawal from the UNFCCC, under which the Paris Agreement was adopted, would also withdraw the state from the Paris Agreement. The conditions for withdrawal from the UNFCCC are the same as for the Paris Agreement.  In the agreement no provisions for non compliance are stated.

On 1 June 2017, then-US President Donald Trump announced that the United States would withdraw from the agreement. In accordance with Article 28, as the agreement entered into force in the United States on 4 November 2016, the earliest possible effective withdrawal date for the United States was 4 November 2020. If it had chosen to withdraw by way of withdrawing from the UNFCCC, notice could be given immediately (the UNFCCC entered into force for the US in 1994), and be effective one year later. On August 4, 2017, the Trump administration delivered an official notice to the United Nations that the US intended to withdraw from the Paris Agreement as soon as it is legally eligible to do so.  The formal notice of withdrawal could not be submitted until the agreement had been in force for 3 years for the US, in 2019.

According to a memo obtained by HuffPost believed to be written by US State Department legal office, any "attempts to withdraw from the Paris Agreement outside of the above-described withdrawal provisions would be inconsistent with international law and would not be accepted internationally."

On 4 November 2019, the United States notified the depositary of its withdrawal from the agreement, to be effective exactly one year from that date. In one of his first executive actions, President Joe Biden signed an order that would have the United States rejoin the agreement.

He was greeted by French President Emmanuel Macron with a "Welcome back to the Paris Agreement!"

Signatories
A further three states have signed but not ratified the Paris Agreement.

Notes and references

Notes

References 

United Nations Framework Convention on Climate Change
Paris Agreement